Murati is a surname. Notable people with the surname include:

 Agim Murati (1953 – 2005), Albanian footballer
 Aljmir Murati (born 1985), Swiss footballer
 Edvin Murati (born 1975),  Albanian former footballer
 Emir Murati (born 2000), Italian footballer
 Eva Murati (born 1995),  Albanian actress and TV host
 Hekuran Murati (born 1987), Kosovar Albanian economist and politician
 Mevlan Murati (born 1994), Macedonian footballer

See also 
 Murati Lake